Adventures of Dino Riki, known in Japan as , is a video game released  in 1987 for the Family Computer in Japan and 1989 for the Nintendo Entertainment System in the North America. 

Despite being developed by Hudson Soft in Japan, it was published there by Rix Soft, making it the sole video game ever released by this publisher. In North America, the game was published by Hudson Soft.

Overview

Adventures of Dino Riki is an overhead shooter created by Hudson Soft, similar to games like 1943: The Battle of Midway, where the object is to dodge on-screen enemies. Dino Riki can jump or shoot weapons (rocks, axes, boomerangs, and torches) to kill the various enemies around him. Dino Riki can pick up power-ups including speed boosts and wings that enable him to fly over hazards on the ground, as well as weapon upgrades. He starts his adventure throwing rocks that have a very limited range and power, and can upgrade to axes and then boomerangs, each increasing the range and spread of his shot, finally gaining a rapid-fire volley of torches that spreads across the screen. There is a last weapon/powerup called "Macho Ricky" where Ricky converts itself into a huge caveman that shoots some sort of copies of his body. He utilizes these caveman weapons and power-ups to help kill enemies and avoid the dangers of a Neanderthal life.

He progresses through three types of worlds (land, ruined city, and mountains) and plays through four worlds total. Worlds one, two, and three are one stage each and have checkpoints, but world four is four stages with no checkpoints. At the end of each stage, Dino Riki must face a boss.

The titular Riki gets his name from Japanese pro wrestler Riki Choshu. The Japanese version of the game was endorsed by Choshu, with the star appearing in advertising for the game. When the player gets a Riki power-up in the Japanese version, he transforms into Choshu and can cause damage with his trademark Riki lariat.

Reception
In the July/August 1989 edition of Nintendo Power, the game received, out of five, ratings of 3.5, 3.5, 3 and 3 respectively for the categories "Graphic and Sound", "Play Control", "Challenge", and "Theme Fun".

References

External links

Adventures of Dino Riki at GameFAQs

1987 video games
Dinosaurs in video games
Hudson Soft games
Nintendo Entertainment System games
Nintendo Entertainment System-only games
Prehistoric people in popular culture
Video games set in prehistory
Scrolling shooters
Top-down video games
Video games based on real people
Video games developed in Japan
Video games scored by Takeaki Kunimoto